Aramis, or the Love of Technology, was written by French sociologist/anthropologist Bruno Latour. Aramis was originally published in French in 1993; the English translation by Catherine Porter, copyrighted in 1996, is now in its fourth printing (2002). Latour describes his text as "scientifiction," which he describes as "a hybrid genre... for a hybrid task" (p. ix). The genre includes voices of a young engineer discussing his "sociotechnological initiation," his professor's commentary which introduces Actor-network theory (ANT), field documents - including real-life interviews, and the voice of Aramis—a failed technology ( p. x).

The book is a quasi-mystery, which attempts to discover who killed Aramis (personal rapid transit). Aramis was supposed to be implemented as a Personal Rapid Transit (PRT) system in Paris. Simultaneously, while investigating Aramis's demise, Latour delineates the tenets of Actor-network theory. Latour argues that the technology failed not because any particular actor killed it, but because the actors failed to sustain it through negotiation and adaptation to a changing social situation.

Table of contents 
 Preface
 Prologue: Who Killed Aramis?
 An Exciting Innovation
 Is Aramis Feasible?
 Shilly-Shallying in the Seventies
 Interphase: Three Years of Grace
 The 1984 Decision: Aramis Exists for Real
 Aramis at the CET Stage: Will it Keep its Promise?
 Aramis is Ready to Go (Away)
 Epilogue: Aramis Unloved
 Glossary

See also 
 Laboratory Life (with Steve Woolgar)
 Science in Action (book)
 Politics of Nature
 We Have Never Been Modern

References

1993 books
Actor-network theory
Harvard University Press books
Works by Bruno Latour
Science and technology studies works